Jatibarang Station is a railway station at Mayor Sangun Street (Market), Jatibarang, Jatibarang, Indramayu Regency, West Java. It is on the main northern Java route line from Jakarta to Surabaya.

Services

Passenger services

Executive class 

Mixed class 
 Argo Cheribon, destination  and - (executive-economy)
 Brantas, destination  of  via --

Economy class 
 Sawunggalih, destination  of  via -
 Tawang Jaya, destination of 
 Tawang Jaya, destination of 

References

External links 

Indramayu Regency
Railway stations in West Java